Camp Wilderness may be:

 Camp Wilderness (Michigan)
 Camp Wilderness (Minnesota)
 Camp Wilderness (Utah)